The International Hellenic University is a university in Greece. It was initially established in October 2005 and was based in Thessaloniki, Greece.

History 
The International Hellenic University was initially established in October 2005 and was exclusively based in Thessaloniki, Greece. It was Greece's first public university where programmes were taught exclusively in English and it was composed of three schools, offering twenty-four master programmes.

The university's structure was reformed in 2019, now incorporating the three TEIs from Northern Greece (the Alexander Technological Educational Institute of Thessaloniki, the TEI of Central Macedonia and the TEI of Eastern Macedonia and Thrace). The final university structure resulted into nine schools and thirty-three departments, with campuses scattered across nine Greek cities (Thermi, Sindos, Kavala, Serres, Drama, Katerini, Edessa, Kilkis, Didymoteicho).
The main funds for the university operations come from the Greek state and the European Union.

Organization 
The university is composed of 9 schools:

Campuses 
Since the 2019 merge with the TEIs in Northern Greece, the International Hellenic University has become one of the largest Greek universities.

Thermi campus 

The Thermi campus is the original International Hellenic University site, where the institution operated exclusively from 2005 until 2019. It is located in the outskirts of Thermi and is composed of two main buildings. After the 2019 merge, the campus was established as the administrative site for the entire university.

Sindos campus (former Alexander TEI of Thessaloniki) 

Located 15 km west of Thessaloniki, the campus is built in an area of about 65 square kilometers, which makes it the biggest site among the university's ones. About 1000 acres are occupied by a farm.

The campus is equipped with two restaurants (one reserved to teaching and general staff and one for students), two basketball courts, a soccer field and an indoor gym.

Serres campus (former TEI of Central Macedonia)

Kavala campus (former TEI of Eastern Macedonia and Thrace)

See also
 Open access in Greece

References

External links 

 

Education in Thessaloniki
Universities in Greece